Sir Thomas Clanvowe (died 1410) was a British landowner, Member of Parliament and Sheriff of Herefordshire.

Life
Clanvowe was probably the son of Sir John Clanvowe (died 1391) of Hergest, Herefordshire. The surmame is an Anglicised Welsh name, presumably Llanfawr.

In 1391 he entered the service of King Richard II as one of the Kings' esquires. In 1392 he married Perryne, the daughter of Sir Robert Whitney of Whitney-on-Wye, Herefordshire and one of Queen Anne's ladies-in-waiting. They had no children. He was knighted in 1394/5 after taking part in a military expedition to Ireland and in 1400 took part in an invasion of Scotland under Richard, Lord Grey of Codnor.

He was elected Knight of the Shire (MP) for Herefordshire in 1394 and January and September 1397. 
He was a Justice of the Peace (JP) for Herefordshire from 1397 to 1399 and appointed Sheriff of Herefordshire for 1397–1399. In 1401 he accompanied Queen Isabella back to France after the overthrow of Richard II. In 1402 he accompanied Sir Edmund Mortimer on his campaign against the rebel Welsh leader, Owain Glyndŵr, but the English were defeated at the Battle of Bryn Glas near Knighton, Radnorshire, and Clanvowe captured (but later released).

He was a member of a group known as the Lollard knights after their heretical (Lollard) beliefs.

Death and succession
He died without surviving progeny, when his heir became his aunt Elizabeth Clanvowe, the wife of John Poyntz (died 1366) lord of the manor of Iron Acton in Gloucestershire.

References

External links  

 

1410 deaths
English MPs 1394
English MPs January 1397
English MPs September 1397
14th-century English politicians
15th-century English politicians
High Sheriffs of Herefordshire
Year of birth unknown